Vesey Street is a street in New York City that runs east-west in Lower Manhattan.  The street is named after Rev. William Vesey (1674-1746), the first rector of nearby Trinity Church.

History
The intersection of Vesey and West Streets was the site of the Washington Market, the city's main produce market. Established in 1812, its location near the docks facilitated the movement of goods.

Prior to the construction of the World Trade Center it ran as a continuous street from Broadway to the Hudson River. As of 2013, it is still a continuous street, but it has four discontinuous segments with mixed uses:

From Broadway to Church Street for motor vehicles and pedestrians.
From Church Street to West Street for authorized motor vehicles and pedestrians.  This portion was widened during construction of the World Trade Center, and separates WTC on the street's south side from the Verizon Building on the street's north side.
In Battery Park City, from West Street to North End Avenue for motor vehicles and pedestrians.
From North End Avenue to River Terrace and the Irish Hunger Memorial, for pedestrians only.

The eastern extension of the street at Broadway is Ann Street.

Architecture 
Designed by Robert D. Kohn in the Art Nouveau style, the Old New York Evening Post Building at 20 Vesey Street was completed in 1907. It was designated as a New York City landmark in 1965 and added to the National Register of Historic Places in 1977.

The Barclay–Vesey Building occupies the entire block bounded by West Street to the west, Barclay Street to the north, Vesey Street to the south, and Washington Street to the east. Built in 1923, it served as the corporate headquarters of New York Telephone Company (NYTel). Verizon maintains a presence at this location, although its headquarters is now in Midtown. The Art Deco building was designated as a New York City landmark in 1991 and added to the National Register of Historic Places in 2009.

Adjacent to Vesey Street is St. Paul's Chapel, the Church Street Station Post Office, and the World Trade Center.  The street next to the World Trade Center was closed to pedestrians after the terrorist attacks of September 11, 2001, and has not yet been reopened to vehicular traffic. A structure left standing after the collapse of the adjacent buildings is known as the Survivors' Staircase which has been preserved and can be viewed in the National September 11 Memorial & Museum. The World Trade Center PATH station is accessible from the street at the World Trade Center site.

Just past the western end of the street is the Irish Hunger Memorial. This end of the street is in the northern part of Battery Park City.

Vesey Street was the birthplace of The Great Atlantic and Pacific Tea Company, the retail group more commonly known as "A&P."

Gallery

See also
 200 Vesey Street - American Express Tower

References

External links

  at Vesey Street

Vesey